Upper Nile may refer to:
Upper portion of the river Nile and its surrounding areas.
Greater Upper Nile (region), a region of South Sudan
Upper Nile (state), a state of South Sudan